The 1998–99 Kategoria e Dytë was the 52nd season of a second-tier association football league in Albania.

Group A

Group B

Group C

Group D

Championship/promotion playoff

Semi-finals

Final 

 Shqiponja was promoted to 1999–2000 National Championship.

References

 Giovanni Armillotta, Fatjon Pandovski

Kategoria e Parë seasons
2
Alba